In international relations,  is France's sphere of influence (or  in French, meaning 'backyard') over former French and Belgian colonies in sub-Saharan Africa. The term was derived from the expression , which was used by the first president of Ivory Coast, Félix Houphouët-Boigny, in 1955 to describe his country's close ties with France. It was later pejoratively renamed  by François-Xavier Verschave in 1998 to criticise the alleged corrupt and clandestine activities of various Franco-African political, economic and military networks, also defined as France's neocolonialism.

The United States supported France's continuing presence in Africa to prevent the region from falling under Soviet influence during the Cold War. France kept close political, economic, military and cultural ties with its former African colonies that were multi-layered, involving institutional, semi-institutional and informal levels.

 has been characterised by several features that emerged during the Cold War, the first of which was the African cell, a group that comprised the French President and his close advisors who made policy decisions on Africa, often in close collaboration with powerful business networks and the French secret service. France also saw itself as a guarantor of stability in the region and therefore adopted an interventionist policy in Africa, resulting in military interventions that averaged once a year from 1960 to the mid-1990s. These networks often lacked oversight and scrutinity, which led to corruption and state racketeering.

After the Cold War, the  regime weakened due to France's budgetary constraints, greater public scrutiny at home, the deaths of pivotal  actors (Foccart, Mitterrand, Pasqua and members of Elf), and the integration of France into the European Union. Economic liberalisation, high indebtedness and political instability of the former African colonies have reduced their political and economic attractiveness, leading France to adopt a more pragmatic and hard-nose approach to its African relations.

Etymology 
The term  was derived from the expression , which was used in 1955 by President Félix Houphouët-Boigny of Ivory Coast, who advocated maintaining a close relationship with France, while acceding to independence. Close cooperation between Houphouët-Boigny and Jacques Foccart, chief advisor on African policy in the Charles de Gaulle and Georges Pompidou governments (1958–1974) is thought to have contributed to the "Ivorian miracle" of economic and industrial progress.

The term was subsequently renamed  by François-Xavier Verschave and was used as the title of his 1998 book, which criticises French policies in Africa. Verschave and the association Survie, of which he was president until his death in 2005, re-used the expression of Houphouët-Boigny to name and denounce the many concealed bonds between France and Africa. He later defined Françafrique as "the secret criminality in the upper echelons of French politics and economy, where a kind of underground Republic is hidden from view".

Pun 
Verschave also noted the pun in the term , as it sounds like "" (a source of cash for France;  is French slang for 'cash'), and that "Over the course of four decades, hundreds of thousands of euros misappropriated from debt, aid, oil, cocoa... or drained through French importing monopolies, have financed French political-business networks (all of them offshoots of the main neo-Gaullist network), shareholders' dividends, the secret services' major operations and mercenary expeditions".

History

Charles de Gaulle's presidency (1958–1969) 

When Charles de Gaulle returned to power as French President in 1958, France had already been severely weakened by World War II and by the conflicts in Indochina and Algeria. He proceeded to grant independence to France's remaining colonies in sub-Saharan Africa in 1960 in an effort to maintain close cultural and economic ties with them and to avoid more costly colonial wars. Compared to the decolonisation of French Indochina and Algeria, the transfer of power in sub-Saharan was, for the most part, peaceful. Nevertheless, de Gaulle was keen on preserving France's status as a global power (or ) and as a bulwark to British and American influence in a post-colonial world. Thus, he saw close links with France's former African colonies as an opportunity to enhance France's image on the world stage, both as a major power and as a counterbalancing force between the United States and the Soviet Union during the Cold War. The United States supported France's continuing presence in Africa to prevent the region from falling under Soviet influence. Similarly, the United Kingdom had little interest in West Africa, which left France as the only major power in that region.

On August 24, 1958, in Brazzaville, President Charles de Gaulle recognized that African states had legitimate demands in terms of independence, but that they should go through a period of political learning in the French Community, an organization encompassing France and its colonies. A referendum was organized on September 28, 1958, to decide on the faith of the African states in question. Voting "yes" meant joining the French Community and engaging on a path to independence, while voting "no" meant immediate independence. De Gaulle had also warned that states voting "no" would commit "secession", and that France would pull out their financial and material aids. All voted yes but Guinea, led by Ahmed Sékou Touré, head of the Democratic Party of Guinea. On October 2, 1958, Guinea proclaimed its independence, and Sékou Touré became its first ever president. At the time, France was still processing its defeat in Indochina, and feared uprisings in Cameroon and other African nations. Paris feared that Guinea could incite similar movements in the region, so they decided to engage in political and economic retaliation. Though Sékou Touré had send a letter to de Gaulle on October 15, 1958, asking for Guinea to stay in the CFA franc zone, France banished them from the monetary union in the wake of their independence. Resolutely isolated, Guinea got closer to Eastern Bloc countries in the context of the Cold War. They started working on a new currency with the help of foreign experts, but France saw this as a threat to the stability in the region and its influence there. Therefore, in 1959, France launched operations to undermine the regime in place. Among the methods of destabilization used, one called "Operation Persil" involved introducing a large quantity of fake bills of the new currency in the country to cause inflation and disturb the economy. Nevertheless, with the help of the USSR and China, Sékou Touré's regime held on power until his death in 1984.

To implement his vision of France's , de Gaulle appointed Jacques Foccart, a close adviser and former intelligence member of the French Resistance during World War II, as Secretary-General for African and Malagasy Affairs. Foccart played a pivotal role in maintaining France's sphere of influence in sub-Saharan Africa as he put in place a series of cooperation accords that covered political, economic, military and cultural sectors with an ensemble of African countries, which included France's former colonies in sub-Saharan Africa (Benin, Burkina Faso, Central African Republic, Chad, Comoros,  Djibouti, Gabon, Guinea, Ivory Coast, Mali, Mauritania, Niger, Republic of the Congo and Senegal), former United Nations trust territories (Cameroon and Togo), former Belgian colonies (Rwanda, Burundi and Democratic Republic of Congo) and ex-Portuguese (Guinea-Bissau) and Spanish (Equatorial Guinea) territories. France's relationship with this whole ensemble was managed by the Ministry of Cooperation, which was created in 1961 out of the old colonial ministry, Ministry for Overseas France. The Ministry of Cooperation served as a focal point for France's new system of influence in Africa and was later merged with the Ministry of Foreign Affairs in 1999. Foccart also built a dense web of personal networks that underpinned the informal and family-like relationships between French and African leaders. These accords and relationships, along with the franc zone, allowed France to maintain close ties with its former colonies in sub-Saharan Africa that were multi-layered, involving institutional, semi-institutional and informal levels.

Foccart continued to serve as chief adviser until he was replaced with his younger deputy, René Journiac, by French President Valéry Giscard d'Estaing. Upon becoming President of France in 1995, Chirac again sought Foccart's counsel and even brought him on his first trip to Africa as French President. Foccart continued to play a role in Franco-African relations until his death in 1997.

Georges Pompidou's presidency (1969–1974) 
During his 5 years in power George Pompidou did not break with the Gaullist tradition. Françafrique was very strong under the leadership of Jacques Foccart, and these years consolidated a system of networks between France, French companies, and African elites.

Valéry Giscard d'Estaing's presidency (1974–1981) 
When Valéry Giscard d'Estaing came to power in 1974, he intended on breaking with the practices of de Gaulle and modernize relations between France and Africa. Despite these intentions, he faced several obstacles. First of all, the networks of Françafrique endure thanks to René Journiac, Foccart's successor, who maintained strong ties with South Africa despite Apartheid, but also with Congo, Gabon, and Niger, whose raw materials were essential to France. He was also confronted with the political instability of African states, which led him to play the role of "policeman of Africa", i.e. to intervene militarily, notably in Chad and Zaire, to lend a hand to local leaders. Finally, the last obstacle was that the French president was involved in corruption cases revealed by the Canard Enchainé in October 1979. Jean-Bedel Bokassa, emperor of the Central African Republic, is said to have sent him suitcases of diamonds on several occasions. Silent about the affair at first, he finally spoke out as new evidence emerged and declared that the gifts received were all sold and the money collected paid to NGOs. More than the facts, it is above all the symbolism of the affair that shook Valéry Giscard d'Estaing.

François Mitterrand's presidency (1981–1995) 
During François Mitterrand's 14 years in power, two dynamics confronted each other. First, there was the imperative to defend French interests in the African region. This is in line with the political choices of Mitterrand's predecessors, even though he was a socialist, unlike de Gaulle and Pompidou. Nevertheless, there was a change of doctrine in terms of foreign policy concerning Françafrique. Mitterrand made public financial and material aid distributed by the French state conditional on the democratization of African countries.

Additionally, unlike his predecessors who maintained strong ties with South Africa, Mitterrand denounced the crimes of Apartheid.

When Jacques Chirac was the French Prime Minister from 1986 to 1988 during the cohabitation, he consulted Foccart on African issues.

Jacques Chirac's presidency (1995–2007) 
In 1995, after several attempts Jacques Chirac was elected president of France. Along with him he brought Jacques Foccart who had been his advisor on African matters during his time as mayor of Paris and Prime Minister. Generally speaking, Chirac continued French diplomatic efforts to maintain the special ties with Africa that de Gaulle had built earlier. He was thus opposed to the devaluation of the CFA franc as well as to the reform of the Cooperation, because this was for him an abandonment of French solidarity on the African continent. He was appreciated by the African political leaders in place, but he did not make the issue of human rights a priority in his foreign policy, as shown by his proximity to the authoritarian regime of Mobutu Sese Seko in Zaire.

Nicolas Sarkozy's presidency (2007–2012) 
Nicolas Sarkozy has worked to transform the Franco-African relationship. He attached the "African cell" of the French state to the diplomatic cell, thus closing the page on decades of official and unofficial networks once woven by Jacques Foccart. However, he also caused indignation when, in a speech on July 26, 2007, at the Cheikh Anta Diop University in Dakar, he declared that "the African man has not entered history enough" and that "the problem of Africa is that it lives too much in the present in nostalgia for the lost paradise of childhood."

Francois Hollande's presidency (2012–2017) 
The five-year term of François Hollande is marked by an ambivalence in French foreign policy on Africa. Indeed, when he came to power he promised the end of Françafrique and also declared that "the time of Françafrique is over: there is France, there is Africa, there is the partnership between France and Africa, with relations based on respect, clarity and solidarity." However, under Hollande military troops are deployed in the Sahel, and ties are built of maintained with more or less occult networks. He is also shown in the presence of many African dictators such as Idriss Déby or Paul Biya, recalling the difficulty of France to break clearly with Françafrique as its interests are embedded there. This is not without recalling the hopes and delusions associated with the Mitterrand years in these matters.

Emmanuel Macron's presidency (2017–present) 
In August 2017, Emmanuel Macron founded the Presidential Council for Africa, an advisory body composed of people from civil society, members of the African diaspora for most. While its supporters see this institution as a way to bring together civil society personalities around issues related to Africa rather than officials or business leaders, other see it as a new bridge between African elites, the Diaspora, and French interests in the Africa.

In April 2021, President Macron visited Chad for the funerals of President Idriss Déby, who died while commanding military forces fighting rebels from the Front for Change and Concord in Chad (FACT) on the frontline. Idriss Déby ruled Chad from 1990 to his death, and he was succeeded by his son and army general Mahamat Déby who staged what some called an "institutional coup d'état". Following that, the official visit of the French head of state contributed in legitimizing his authoritarian regime. Indeed, France has a lot to lose if Chad becomes unstable since the country is one of France's most important partners in its fight against terrorism in the Sahel region. Therefore, maintaining strong diplomatic ties with Chad is a priority for France.

Features from the Cold War

African cell 
They along with their close advisors formed the African cell, which made decisions on African countries without engaging in broader discussions with the French Parliament and civil society actors such as non-governmental organisations. Instead, the African cell worked closely with powerful business networks and the French secret service.

The African cell's founding father, Jacques Foccart, was appointed by President Charles de Gaulle. He became a specialist on African matters at the Élysée Palace. Between 1986 and 1992, Jean-Christophe Mitterrand, the son of President François Mitterrand and a former AFP journalist in Africa, held the position of chief advisor on African policy at the African cell. He was nicknamed  (translated as 'Daddy told me'). He was appointed as a diplomatic advisor on Africa but the difference in titles was only symbolic. Subsequently, Claude Guéant served as Africa Advisor to President Sarkozy. In 2017, President Macron appointed Franck Paris to the same role.

Franc zone 

The franc zone, a currency union in sub-Saharan Africa, was established when the CFA franc (or ) was created in 1945 as a colonial currency for over a dozen of France's African colonies. The zone continued to exist even after the colonies had achieved their independence in the early 1960s, with only three African countries ever leaving the zone, mostly for reasons of national prestige. One of the three countries, Mali, rejoined the zone in 1984. The CFA franc was pegged to the French franc, and now the euro, and its convertibility is guaranteed by the French Treasury. Despite sharing the same exchange rate, the CFA franc is actually two currencies, the Central African CFA franc and the West African CFA franc, which are run by their respective central banks in Central and West Africa. The foreign exchange reserves of member countries are pooled and each of the two African central banks keeps 65% of its foreign reserves with the French Treasury.

The franc zone was intended to provide African countries with monetary stability, with member countries such as Ivory Coast experiencing relatively low inflation at an average rate of 6% over the past 50 years compared to 29% in neighboring Ghana, a non-member country. Moreover, the fixed exchange rate between the CFA Franc and the French franc has changed only once in 1994 when the CFA franc was considered overvalued. However, this monetary arrangement has enabled France to control the money supply of the CFA franc and to influence the decision-making process of the African central banks through their boards.

The parity of the CFA franc to the euro has allowed French companies and French people to buy African resources (e.g., cocoa, coffee, gold, uranium, etc.) without having to pay any foreign currency. It also serves as a guaranty for French investments in the region as the CFA franc is pegged on the euro which means that there is little risks of monetary fluctuations. Many French corporations such as TotalEnergies, Orange, or Bouygues have used this free movement of capital to bring back profits made in these 14 countries, without any typical risks associated to foreign currency exchanges.

Critics of the CFA franc also point to the structure of the CFA franc to euro convertibility as being unfair since the economic cycles happening inside the Eurozone differ from those happening in the UEMOA and the CEMAC. This indirectly leaves the 14 African states subject to EU dynamics in terms of monetary policy. Nonetheless, while the European Central Bank's main mission is to control inflation in the EU, most African states' present priorities are creating jobs and investing in infrastructures, which are policies driving inflation. Therefore, some say that the convertibility of the CFA franc is a disservice to the development of African nations.

Cooperation accords 
This concept was linked to the effort of spreading French influence across the world such as promoting French language and culture, securing markets for French goods and projecting French power. It was to be achieved outside of a traditional colonial context whereby sovereign states such as France and the newly independent African countries would work together for mutual benefit. The concept of  also appealed to France's sense of historic responsibility to advance the development of its former colonial "family". To that end, France signed cooperation accords with its former colonies, which provided them with cultural, technical and military assistance such as sending French teachers and military advisors to work for the newly formed African governments. The accords also allowed France to maintain troops in Chad, Djibouti, Gabon, Ivory Coast and Senegal, and to establish a framework that would allow France to intervene militarily in the region.

In the aftermath of World War Two, France took steps to create a military nuclear program. In principle, this would have allowed it to protect itself from the Soviet threat in the East, but also to guarantee peace in Europe and a certain independence from the United States. However, in order to do this, France needed a stable supply of uranium, and so they signed a cooperation agreement with Niger in the early 1960s to get access to the African state's uranium reserves. This agreement was a priority for then President Charles de Gaulle who wished to compete with the largest nuclear powers.

From 1970 to 1981, the French military cooperation budget constituted 11 to 19% of the entire  budget. Under President de Gaulle, French aid and assistance were made contingent on the signing of these accords. For example, when Guinea refused to sign the accords, France immediately withdrew its personnel from Guinea and terminated all assistance to that country. The implementation of these accords was the responsibility of Jacques Foccart, Secretary-General for African and Malagasy Affairs under Presidents Charles de Gaulle and Georges Pompidou. In 1987, France was the largest source of development aid to sub-Saharan Africa, providing up to 18% of total aid to the region, followed by the World Bank (13%), Italy (8.5%), United States (6.8%), Germany (6.8%), and the European Community (6.4%). All French aid was provided through the Ministry of Cooperation. France has benefited from its aid, trade and investments in Africa, which has consistently generated a positive balance of payment in France's favour.

Military interventions 

After decolonisation, France established formal defence agreements with many francophone countries in sub-Saharan Africa. These arrangements allowed France to establish itself as a guarantor of stability and hegemony in the region. France adopted an interventionist policy in Africa, resulting in 122 military interventions that averaged once a year from 1960 to the mid-1990s and included countries such as Benin (Operation Verdier in 1991), Central African Republic (Operation Barracuda in 1979 and Operation Almandin in 1996), Chad (Opération Bison in 1968–72, Opération Tacaud in 1978, Operation Manta in 1983 and Opération Épervier in 1986), Comoros (Operation Oside in 1989 and Operation Azalee in 1995), Democratic Republic of Congo (Operation Léopard in 1978 and Operation Baumier in 1991 when it was Zaire, and Operation Artemis in 2003),  Djibouti (Operation Godoria in 1991), Gabon (1964 and Operation Requin in 1990), Ivory Coast (Opération Licorne in 2002), Mauritania (Opération Lamantin in 1977), Republic of Congo (Opération Pélican in 1997), Rwanda (Operation Noroît in 1990–93, Operation Amaryllis in 1994 and Opération Turquoise in 1994), Togo (1986), Senegal (prevent a coup d'état in 1962) and Sierra Leone (Operation Simbleau in 1992). France often intervened to protect French nationals, to put down rebellions or prevent coups, to restore order or to support particular African leaders.

Personal networks 

Jacque Foccart put in place these networks, which served as one of the main vehicles for the clientelist relations that France had maintained with its former African colonies. The activities of these networks were not subjected to parliamentary oversight or scrutiny, which led to corruption as politicians and officials became involved in business activities that resulted in state racketeering.

The blurring of state, party and personal interests made it possible for the informal, family-like relationships of the Franco-African bloc to benefit specific interest groups and small sections of French and African populations. For example, major French political parties have received funding from the recycling of part of the  budget, which secretly made its way to the party's coffers via Africa and from Elf, a French state-owned oil company, when it achieved its strategic objectives in Africa. African leaders and the small French-speaking elites to which they belonged also benefited from this informal relationship as it provided them with political, economic and military support.

Post-Cold War era

The  regime was at its height from 1960 to 1989 but after the Cold War, it has weakened due to France's budgetary constraints, greater public scrutiny at home, the deaths of pivotal  figures and the integration of France into the European Union. Economic liberalisation, high indebtedness and political instability of the former African colonies have reduced their political and economic attractiveness, leading France to adopt a more pragmatic and hard-nosed approach to its African relations. Furthermore, many of the dense web of informal networks that bound France to Africa have declined.

The pre-1990 aid regime of the old , which has made the sub-Saharan African countries economically dependent on France has now given way to a new regime that is supposed to promote self-sufficiency as well as political and economic liberalism. France has also adopted the Abidjan doctrine, which has internationalised the economic dependency of African countries by having them first reach an agreement with the International Monetary Fund (IMF) before receiving French aid. This in turn has decreased the French government's ability to manoeuvre freely to pursue its own distinctive African policy. As a result, the old Franco-African bloc has now splintered, with France adopting a new style of relationship with its former African colonies.

France has made efforts to reduce its military footprint in Africa by making multilateral arrangements with African and European states. French President François Hollande started his tenure with a commitment to non-interventionism. However, a year later, France intervened in Mali at the request of the Malian government, sending 4,000 troops (see Operation Serval, then Operation Barkhane). According to a 2020 study, "France's commitment to multilateralism is genuine yet not absolute – meaning that French policy-makers do not shy away from operational unilateralism if conditions on the ground seem to require swift and robust military action, as long as they can count on the political support of key international partners."

The French Development Agency (AFD) and Caisse des Dépôts et des Consignations (CDC) signed a strategic alliance charter in December 2016, one of the financial drivers of which is the creation of a €500 million investment fund. This fund is used to finance infrastructure projects in Africa, in various sectors (energy, telecommunications, etc.). Some critics, however, point to the fund's strategy of creating opportunities and opening the market to mostly French companies, thus feeding capital transfer bridges that are the roots of Françafrique.

The arrestation of Senegalese opposition leader and member of Parliament Ousmane Sonko for allegations of rape, in Senegal, in March 2021, shook the country. Senegalese people, especially young ones, critiqued the lack of transparency of the proceedings, and saw this as a political maneuver orchestrated by President Macky Sall to suppress the opposition before the next presidential elections in Senegal. Protesters took to the streets, and days of chaos ensued. Among their grievances, people blamed Sall for leaning too much towards France, giving too many opportunities to French companies when local businesses could step in. To manifest this frustration protesters targeted French corporate symbols such as Auchan supermarkets, Orange stores, and TotalEnergies gas stations. Some protesters also committed looting and destroyed property. These companies were accused by protesters of reaping benefits from the hands of Senegalese people.

On December 21, 2019, French President Emmanuel Macron, and Ivorian President Alassane Ouattara announced in a press conference that they had signed a new cooperation accord replacing that of 1973. This agreement replaced the West African CFA franc with the Eco, the new currency for the Economic Community of West African States (ECOWAS). This will only apply to countries belonging to the West African Economic and Monetary Union (UEMOA) which includes Benin, Burkina Faso, Guinea-Bissau, Ivory Coast, Mali, Niger, Senegal, and Togo, and not to member states of the Economic and Monetary Community of Central Africa (CEMAC from its French appellation), which use the Central African CFA franc and includes Cameroon, the Central African Republic, Chad, Equatorial Guinea, Gabon, and the Republic of the Congo.

A bill approving the new cooperation accord was ratified on November 10, 2020, by the French National Assembly, and then by the French Senate on January 28, 2021. The text is composed of three main reforms: the change of currency from the CFA franc to the eco, the abolition of the obligation to centralize 50% of the CFA franc reserves at the Banque of France, and the withdrawal of French representatives from the UEMOA's governing bodies (e.g., BCEAO's board, UMOA's banking commission, etc.).

In June 2021, Emmanuel Macron announced that Operation Barkhane was drawing down to be gradually replaced by the international Takuba Task Force. As of 2021, France retains the largest military presence in Africa of any former colonial power. The French presence has been complicated by other expanding spheres of influence in Africa such as those of Russia and China. In 2016, China's investment in Africa was $38.4 billion versus France's $7.7 billion. Russia has been seen as expanding opportunistically in Africa, with both official military agreements, and the mercenary Wagner Group to which the Kremlin has denied links. Macron has accused Moscow and Ankara of fueling anti-French sentiment in the Central African Republic. One of the main emphases of France's continuing links in Africa is opposing Islamist militants in the Sahel.

Many former French colonies have experienced a growing anti-French sentiment in the past 30 years. This feeling, particularly present among the younger generations who have not experienced colonization or the period of independence, is also reinforced by events such as the genocide of the Tutsi in Rwanda, the civil war in Côte d'Ivoire or the crisis in Libya. While the older generation is more likely to support strong ties with France because they believe it brings stability, the younger generation sees it as a brake on the development of African states and businesses. It is worth noting that this anti-French sentiment is aimed more at France's African foreign policy than at the French people themselves.

The Sahel is an area of land that serves as a demarcation line between Western and Central Africa. It is situated between the nations of Mali, Mauritania, Niger, Chad, and Burkina Faso, which are all former French colonies. In 2012, militant groups affiliated with Al-Qaeda attempted to seize parts of Mali with the intent to take control of other areas within the region. Due to these pertinent issues, the involvement of France has increased in order to provide military assistance to Sahelian countries. This is defined by Operation Serval, which was a French effort under the leadership of former president Francois Hollande in order to prevent Islamist militants from seizing Bamako, Mali. The success of this operation was short-lived as militant groups began to appear in neighboring nations, including Chad and Burkina Faso. By 2014, the French military sent over 5,000 troops to the Sahel under Operation Barkhane as a means to support governments throughout the region in their struggle against Islamist groups. As a result of these operations, French forces have only expanded their oversight throughout the Sahel.

The ongoing conflict between French-backed forces and Jihadist militant groups continues to have detrimental consequences, which have led to increased rates of death and displacement within the Sahel territories. In 2021 alone, almost 6,000 people died due to conflict-related deaths in Niger, Mali, and Burkina Faso. There are also increasing security concerns for coastal nations such as Benin and Senegal as militant groups advance further within the region's borders.

Military operations in the Sahel 
While the support of the French military continues to be a source of protection for countries in the Sahel, recent developments suggest that this reality may soon change. Despite the initial demand for military backing and aid in 2013 and 2014, public opinion has shown less enthusiasm for France's current involvement in the Sahel. People have grown increasingly critical of the French government's action, or lack thereof, in preventing further casualties and attacks by Islamic militant forces. Many have also opposed the strategy of the French military and its lasting presence, which echoes its former colonial past in these territories.

In February 2022, French President Emmanuel Macron announced the official withdrawal of military forces within Mali. His decision follows escalating tensions between the French and Malian governments, the latter of which rose to power through a series of military coups in both 2020 and 2021, respectively. Colonel Assimi Goïta is currently serving as interim president of Mali, with the intention to not hold elections until 2024, with the initial goal of not holding elections until 2027. Under Goïta's rule, Mali has signed a deal with the Wagner Group, a Russian military contractor, which has only heightened France's desire to distance itself from the area. These issues, alongside the removal of the French ambassador in the midst of electoral controversy, played a significant role in the nation's decision to remove its officials from Mali.

While a complete withdrawal of French troops in Mali is now evident, it raises further questions regarding the social and political instability within the Sahel region. Many governments, including Mali and Burkina Faso, lack the infrastructure necessary to combat militant groups from advancing their agendas, which leaves the ability to secure their borders in tandem. Subsequently, the French government is now searching for a means to continue its military presence in a neighboring country as a way to address military concerns while simultaneously furthering its influence upon the region.

Economic interests today 
France's economic interests in Africa have remained important since the end of the Cold War. More than 40,000 French companies are active in Africa, dozens of which are large multinationals such as TotalEnergies, Areva, or Vinci. In fact, France's exports to Africa have increased from 13 billion dollars to 28 billion in the last 20 years, while French foreign direct investment has increased tenfold, from 5.9 billion euros in 2000 to 52.6 billion in 2017. However, it is important to note that while these investments and economic flows have increased, France's market share has drastically decreased since the early 2000s. Indeed, while French exports to Africa have doubled, the total size of the market has quadrupled (from 100 billion dollars to 400); France's market share has therefore been divided by 2 in 20 years.

While France remains a crucial player in the African market, its position has been compromised by other foreign investors such as China, who have recently showcased their interest in the continent. From 2010 to 2015, Chinese investors granted $2.5 billion in loans for infrastructure to Côte d'Ivoire alone. And their sights are set on the entirety of Francophone Africa as they seek new opportunities for development in the private sector. By the end of 2017, China's capital increased at a rate of 332% throughout the region. This leaves China in an economically advantageous position, thereby making their monetary gain a legitimate threat to French investors.

Although France's influence may be weakening throughout Francophone Africa, there also remains strong social and economic ties that link these nations together. One prime example can be displayed through the already established business deals with the French private sector in order to increase development in West Africa. An additional factor that connects France to its former colonies is their usage of the French language. Francophone African nations are placed at an economic advantage within European countries such as France, Switzerland, and Belgium due to their shared linguistic identities.

With increasingly younger populations, African countries are viewed as the ideal candidates for long-term investment by international actors. This sentiment directly reflects France's approach to its former colonies, which comprise over half of its primary trade exports. This includes West African countries such as Senegal and Cameroon, which continue to play an integral role in supplying natural resources, hardware, and manufactured goods. Despite these staggering numbers, France remains in a vulnerable position as it renounces its title as the top investor in the region. The prospect of foreign backers and the appeal of Intra-African trade opportunities have encouraged West African nations to reclaim their economic agency from their former occupiers. Ultimately, these circumstances have contributed to France's declining economic influence.

Currently, French companies are less linked to Africa, or at least to the countries that were formerly colonies of France. France's main economic partners in Africa are indeed the Maghreb countries (Morocco, Algeria, Tunisia), Nigeria, South Africa, and Angola. Some critics of French foreign policy in Africa question the deep commitment that France has with the former French colonies, particularly in sub-Saharan Africa, given the low financial and commercial interest that the countries of the CFA franc zone represent for French companies.

Cultural references

Film
 Françafrique (2010), movie by Patrick Benquet
  (1981), action film by Georges Lautner
 Fratricide in Burkina: Thomas Sankara and French Africa (2008) by Didier Mauro and Thuy-Tiën Ho

Music
 , album and song by Tiken Jah Fakoly
 , song by Tryo
 , song by Refused

Literature
  (2003), novel by Érik Orsenna

See also
France–Africa relations
Hispanic Africa
Monroe Doctrine

Further reading
 Marina E. Henke (2020) "A tale of three French interventions: Intervention entrepreneurs and institutional intervention choices." Journal of Strategic Studies.
Stefano Recchia & Thierry Tardy (2020) "French military operations in Africa: Reluctant multilateralism," Journal of Strategic Studies.
 Thierry Tardy (2020) "France's military operations in Africa: Between institutional pragmatism and agnosticism," Journal of Strategic Studies.

References

External links
François-Xavier Verschave about what Françafrique means.(English)
50 years later Françafrique is alive and well Christophe Boisbouvier, Radio France Internationale (English)
Africa: 50 years of independence Radio France Internationale (English)
French foreign policy in Africa: between pré carré and multilateralism by Sylvain Touati (English)

French Fifth Republic
Foreign relations of France
Neocolonialism
French colonial empire
French colonisation in Africa
French words and phrases
International relations
International relations education
French language in Africa